The Counterfeit Coin (also Η κάλπικη λίρα, I kalpiki lira, "the fake pound") is a Greek comedy-drama film, produced in 1955, written and directed by Giorgos Tzavellas and starring Dimitris Horn, Ilia Livykou and Vassilis Logothetidis. At the 2006 International Thessaloniki Film Festival, the film was announced as among the 10 all-time best Greek films by the PHUCC (Pan-Hellenic Union of Cinema Critics).

Plot

An honest, reserved goldsmith and engraver, Anargyros Loumbardopoulos (Vassilis Logothetidis), has routinely invested his money in gold coins, specifically British gold sovereigns, bought from a friend of his, a banker. Upon having stored away 100 sovereigns, a man working for the banker suggests that Anargyros should start minting counterfeit sovereigns, but he adamantly refuses.

The banker employee then introduces Anargyros to a divorced attractive lady, Fifi (Ilya Livykou) that he knows. Anargyros' resistance is soon curbed by Fifi's sexual means, and he spends all his invested 100 sovereigns to buy minting equipment. After much toil the trio produce their first counterfeit coin, but Anargyros finds it difficult to deceive people into accepting it as currency. People easily understand it is not a genuine coin.

When the sinister employee is arrested, Anargyros fears that the police has discovered their crime and panics.  He gets rid of all the counterfeiting equipment, and also abandons Fifi. It is eventually revealed that it was a misunderstanding and the employee was arrested for other reasons. Safe again, Anargyros returns to his honest work and daily routine.

Anargyros tries to get rid of the counterfeit coin, by giving it away as charity to an apparently blind beggar. The beggar sees through the deceit,  but Anargyros flees in a hurry. The beggar (Mimis Fotopoulos) is in fact a cunning liar with exceptional eyesight, who manages to earn the pity of everyone with his fake blindness. But a street prostitute, Maria (Sperantza Vrana) starts hooking up near the beggar's corner and they find themselves arguing.

Cast

Vassilis Logothetidis as Anargyros Loubardopoulos
Ilia Livykou as Fifi
Mimis Fotopoulos as the beggar
Sperantza Vrana as Maria
Orestis Makris as Vasilis Mavridis
Maria Kalamioti as Fanitsa
Ellie Lambeti as Aliki
Dimitris Horn as Pavlos
Additional cast
Lavrentis Dianellos as Anastasis
Vagelis Protopapas as Dinos
Lela Patrikiou as Mrs. Mavridou
Dimitris Myrat as the narrator
Zoras Tsapelis as Dimitris
Thanos Tzeneralis as George Phil

Reception
As part of the closing night event at the Antipodes Greek Film Festival 2005 in Melbourne, Australia, they screened what they considered a classic 50’s film, The Counterfeit Coin in celebration of the film's 50th anniversary.  At the festival, it was said of the film that it was, "Considered by many to be the best Greek film ever produced..." and "There is no more complete Greek cinematic creation".  And after the festival, "The standout favourites of the Film Festival have been Brides with 3 sell out screenings to date, The Counterfeit Coin, Testosterone and Liza and The Others.

Other information 
The movie saw 1000 simultaneous screenings in Russia.
It was a box office success with 208,410 tickets only from the first run in Athens, more than any other movie for that season.
It has also been honored with several film awards (Venice, Moscow) and nominations.

References

External links

1955 films
1955 comedy-drama films
Films directed by George Tzavellas
Films scored by Manos Hatzidakis
Greek comedy-drama films
Counterfeit money in film
1950s Greek-language films
Greek black-and-white films